Dudshar Union is a union parishad of Shailkupa Upazila, in Jhenaidah District, Khulna Division of Bangladesh. There are 17 villages and 12 Mouzas in the union.

References

External links
 

Unions of Khulna Division
Unions of Shailkupa Upazila
Unions of Jhenaidah District